Penicillium asturianum is an anamorph fungus species of the genus of Penicillium.

See also
List of Penicillium species

References

asturianum
Fungi described in 1981